Congleton was, from 1974 to 2009, a local government district with borough status in Cheshire, England. It included the towns of Congleton, Alsager, Middlewich and Sandbach. The headquarters of the borough council were located in Sandbach.

History

The borough was formed on 1 April 1974 under the Local Government Act 1972 by the merger of the former borough of Congleton, the urban districts of Alsager, Middlewich and Sandbach, and the Congleton Rural District. The new district was awarded borough status from its creation, allowing the chairman of the council to take the title of mayor.

In 2006 the Department for Communities and Local Government considered reorganising Cheshire's administrative structure as part of the 2009 structural changes to local government in England. The decision to merge the boroughs of Congleton, Macclesfield, and Crewe and Nantwich to create a single unitary authority was announced on 25 July 2007, following a consultation period in which a proposal to create a single Cheshire unitary authority was rejected.

The Borough of Congleton was abolished on 31 March 2009, with the area becoming part of the unitary authority of Cheshire East on 1 April 2009.

Civil parishes
Congleton was divided into 23 civil parishes and included no unparished areas. Of the 23 civil parishes, four were administered at this level of local government by town councils: Alsager, Middlewich, Sandbach, and Congleton; with the remainder having parish councils. There are two pairs of civil parishes that are grouped together so that they share a parish council. These are Hulme Walfield and Somerford Booths, whose single parish council is called "Hulme Walfield and Somerford Booths Parish Council", and Newbold Astbury and Moreton cum Alcumlow, whose single parish council is called "Newbold Astbury-cum-Moreton Parish Council".

The following civil parishes were included in the borough:

 Alsager (town)
 Arclid
 Betchton
 Bradwall
 Brereton
 Church Lawton
 Congleton (town)
 Cranage
 Goostrey
 Hassall
 Holmes Chapel
 Hulme Walfield
 Middlewich (town)
 Moreton cum Alcumlow
 Moston
 Newbold Astbury
 Odd Rode
 Sandbach (town)
 Smallwood
 Somerford
 Somerford Booths
 Swettenham
 Twemlow

Demographics
The resident population of the borough, as measured in the 2001 Census, was 90,655, of which 49 per cent were male and 51 per cent were female.

Religion
The percentage of people of each religion in the borough (trom the Census 2001):

Political control
The town of Congleton had been a municipal borough from 1836 to 1974 with a borough council. The first elections to the new Congleton Borough created under the Local Government Act 1972 were held in 1973, initially operating as a shadow authority until the new arrangements came into effect on 1 April 1974. Political control of the council from 1974 until its abolition in 2009 was held by the following parties:

Leadership
The leaders of the council from 1987 were:

Composition
The political composition of the council at its abolition in 2009 was:

Premises
The council was based at Westfields on Middlewich Road in Sandbach. This was a large nineteenth century house which had been bought in 1960 by the Congleton Rural District Council, one of the council's predecessors. In 2005–2007 a replacement headquarters building, also called Westfields, was built in front of the old house, which was then demolished. The new building was formally opened on 25 January 2008. After Congleton Borough Council's abolition, Westfields became the headquarters for the new Cheshire East Council.

Freedom of the Borough
The following people and military units received the Freedom of the Borough of Congleton.

Individuals
Mr G. Chambers:2009

Military Units
 The Cheshire Yeomanry: 1906.
 The Cheshire Regiment: 1969.
First Battalion of the Mercian Regiment:???

Council elections
1973 Congleton Borough Council election
1976 Congleton Borough Council election (New ward boundaries)
1979 Congleton Borough Council election
1980 Congleton Borough Council election
1982 Congleton Borough Council election
1983 Congleton Borough Council election
1984 Congleton Borough Council election
1986 Congleton Borough Council election
1987 Congleton Borough Council election
1988 Congleton Borough Council election
1990 Congleton Borough Council election
1991 Congleton Borough Council election (Borough boundary changes took place but the number of seats remained the same)
1992 Congleton Borough Council election
1994 Congleton Borough Council election
1995 Congleton Borough Council election
1996 Congleton Borough Council election
1998 Congleton Borough Council election
1999 Congleton Borough Council election (New ward boundaries)
2000 Congleton Borough Council election
2002 Congleton Borough Council election
2003 Congleton Borough Council election
2004 Congleton Borough Council election
2006 Congleton Borough Council election
2007 Congleton Borough Council election

By-election results

See also
Education in Congleton Borough

References

English districts abolished in 2009
Districts of England established in 1974
Former non-metropolitan districts of Cheshire
Former boroughs in England
Borough of
Council elections in Cheshire
Borough of Cheshire East
District council elections in England